Castello d'Ischia Lighthouse is an active lighthouse located in the municipality of Ischia, Campania on the Tyrrhenian Sea.

Description
The lighthouse was established in 1913 and consist of a lantern mounted on a steep bastion, toward the seaside, of the Aragonese Castle built in the 15th century. The lighthouse is completely automated and is operated by the Marina Militare with the identification code number 2370 E.F.

See also
 List of lighthouses in Italy
 Ischia

References

External links

 Servizio Fari Marina Militare

Lighthouses in Italy
Lighthouses completed in 1913
1913 establishments in Italy
Ischia
Buildings and structures in the Metropolitan City of Naples